The Utah Blaze was a professional arena football team based in Salt Lake City, Utah and competed in the West Division of the Arena Football League.  Home games were played at the EnergySolutions Arena. In 2013, the team did not submit proper documentation to remain in the AFL and the entire roster was reassigned to other teams in the league.

History

The original Utah Blaze (2006–08)
In September 2004, Commissioner C. David Baker announced that Salt Lake City, Utah was awarded an Arena Football League (AFL) franchise for the 2006 season. The Utah Blaze began play on January 28, 2006, on the road against the San Jose SaberCats. The team was coached by longtime Arizona Rattlers coach Danny White and played its home games at the EnergySolutions Arena in Salt Lake City, home of the National Basketball Association's Utah Jazz. The team was owned by automobile businessmen John Garff, Robert Garff, and Brett Hopkins.

In their first season, the Blaze had the highest average attendance in the Arena Football League, with 15,498 fans per game. They narrowly edged out Philadelphia's 15,463. Prior to the 2006 season, the Blaze had said EnergySolutions Arena held 13,000 fans due to poor sight lines in most of the building. After 16,705 people attended the home opener, that figure was changed to near 15,000. The Blaze topped that figure 5 of the 8 games their first season.

The offense was led by quarterback Joe Germaine and star wide receiver Siaha Burley.  On Saturday, February 11, 2006, the Blaze lost to the New York Dragons 84–81 in the second highest scoring game in the history of the Arena Football League. The Blaze's performance was also the second highest score for a losing team in the AFL's 20-year history.

Despite a losing record of 7–9, the Blaze got into the playoffs as an AC Wildcard (the conference's No. 6 seed). Unfortunately, the newly formed Blaze were given the boot as they lost to the Arizona Rattlers with a final score of 57–34.

The team's mascot was a dalmatian named "Chief". The Blaze were winners of the league"Commissioners Award" in 2006 and won the "Support Staff of the Year Award" in back-to-back seasons (2006–2007), an award that goes to the league's best training and equipment staff, which was headed by Hagen Featherstone and Kevin Seamans in the inaugural season and Kevin Seamans and Darin Featherstone in 2007.

During the 2008 season the Blaze became the first, and only, professional football team to record three 1,500-yard receivers in the same season, with Huey Whittaker, J.J. McKelvey, and Aaron Boone. This also marks the first time three players each caught 120 or more passes in the same season.

Upon the AFL's suspension of operations, the Blaze did so for the same time period.

AFL folding and AIFA (2009)
The second Utah Blaze organization was originally the Utah Valley Thunder, a member of the American Indoor Football Association during the 2009 season. During their lone season in the AIFA, they were based in Orem, Utah, and played their home games at the McKay Events Center. They finished at a respectable 11–3, finishing second in the Western Division and qualifying for a playoff berth before losing to the Wyoming Cavalry in the Western Divisional playoff.

AFL revival and return of the Blaze (2010–2013)
On September 28, 2009, the Thunder announced their intention to join Arena Football 1 for the 2010 season and beyond, also announcing relocation to the E Center (now Maverik Center) in West Valley City. Over two months later, on December 8, AF1 was awarded the original AFL's assets after they submitted the highest bid in a bankruptcy court auction. Current AF1 teams were given the right to adopt the former AFL teams' identities, but initially, Utah chose to brand as the "Utah Thunder." The Blaze's previous owner attempted to claim the Blaze logo as his own, but was unsuccessful in doing so. Finally, on January 26, 2010, the team announced it would indeed be using the Blaze name and logo. Less than a month later, the AF1 announced it was going back to the former Arena Football League moniker.

On January 25, 2011, the team announced in a press release that they would be moving back to the EnergySolutions Arena.

Quarterback Tommy Grady set the single season touchdown record throwing his 118th against the Georgia Force, on June 23, 2012. The Blaze also clinched their first winning season in franchise history during the 2012 season.

For the 2012 season the Blaze's defensive line was coined "Sack Lake City" due to their tremendous amount of pressure and quarterback sacks. In a game against the Iowa Barnstormers the Blaze recorded a league record 11 sacks in one game. Led by the combination of Caesar Rayford and Mike Lewis with 3.5 sacks each. In 2 seasons with the Utah Blaze the pair have recorded 3 All Pro Honors, along with 40 sacks combined.

In March 2013, Co-Owner Kristin Murdock sold her majority ownership share of the team to Salt Lake City businesswoman, Kim Brown.

In September 2013, the Arena Football League announced that the Utah Blaze had not submitted paperwork to the league committing for both the 2014 and 2015 seasons. As a result, the Blaze (along with the Chicago Rush) were removed from the league, with Commissioner Jerry Kurz stating, "We fully expect both Chicago and Utah to return to become members of the AFL family again in the near future".

Season-by-season

Notable players

Final roster

Retired uniform numbers

Arena Football Hall of Famers

Individual awards

All-Arena players
The following Blaze players were named to All-Arena Teams:
 QB Joe Germaine (1), Tommy Grady (1)
 WR Siaha Burley (1), Huey Whittaker (1), Aaron Boone (1), Aaron Lesué (1)
 DL Caesar Rayford (1), Mike Lewis (2)
 OS Siaha Burley (1)

All-Ironman players
The following Blaze players were named to All-Ironman Teams: 
 OL/DL Hans Olsen (1)
 WR/LB Ryan Dennard (1)

All-Rookie players
The following Blaze players were named to All-Rookie Teams:
 DL Maurice Fountain

Coaches

References

External links
 Utah Blaze at ArenaFan

 
2006 establishments in Utah
2008 disestablishments in Utah
2010 establishments in Utah
2013 disestablishments in Utah